The 2018 season was the Pittsburgh Steelers' 86th as a professional sports franchise and as a member of the National Football League. It also marked the 19th season under leadership of general manager Kevin Colbert and the 12th under head coach Mike Tomlin. After starting the season 7–2–1, the Steelers lost four of their last six games (including losing three straight to the AFC West), allowing the Ravens to clinch the AFC North on the last day of the season, and missing the playoffs for the first time since 2013.

Off-the-field events
The team was mocked in the media due to conflict between team members and staff during both the off-season and the regular season, and for subsequently missing the playoffs after a 7–2–1 start in light of the conflict. Star running back Le'Veon Bell refused to sign his franchise tag, holding out for a more permanent contract for what was first expected to be the first few weeks of the season, but later missing out on the entire season. Quarterback Ben Roethlisberger received criticism for openly calling out teammates during public interviews with the media, as well as for his initial reaction to the team drafting quarterback Mason Rudolph.

Most notably, wide receiver Antonio Brown was involved with a string of incidents, ranging from tossing furniture out of his apartment window in the off-season, arguing with offensive coordinator Randy Fichtner, clashing with the media about his role on the offense, and getting cited for speeding in excess of over 100 mph along a suburban highway. These incidents culminated in Brown reportedly getting into a heated argument with Roethlisberger and benched for the final game of the season against the Cincinnati Bengals as a result, then storming out of the team facility and ignoring all contact from teammates, coaches, and the front office. Brown's tipping point was suggested to be the Steelers' decision to name receiver JuJu Smith-Schuster as team MVP leading up to Week 17 which also led up to Brown demanding a trade from the Steelers a few days after the season where he would be eventually traded to the Oakland Raiders at the start of the new NFL year. Brown also openly called out Smith-Schuster via Twitter and Instagram in April 2019 due to his game losing fumble in a Week 16 loss to the New Orleans Saints, which crippled the Steelers playoff chances.

Following the season, fans, commentators, and numerous current and former Steelers lamented the conflict inside the organization, with some blaming the team culture for the late season collapse (which included four close, mistake-filled and penalty-prone losses within the final six games) and head coach Mike Tomlin for his inability to control a drama-filled locker room. The drama during the Steelers' 2018 season was most notably chronicled in satirical fashion by Steve Linkowski, a Pittsburgh-based YouTube personality, former video game reviewer, and prominent Steelers fan known for his colorful and rant-filled videos poking fun at sports franchises on his channel UrinatingTree. Linkowski dubbed his video series focusing on the off-the-field drama as "Days of our Steelers" as a parody of NBC's soap opera TV show Days of Our Lives. In addition to gaining viral popularity, the series received significant praise from sports fans for its raw, honest, and in-depth look at the drama within the team from a fan's perspective. The team blocked UrinatingTree on Twitter by Week 6. The series has continued, albeit more sporadically, during the 2019 and 2020 seasons, and multiple allusions to the series were made during the 2021 and 2022 seasons.

Transactions
The Steelers were involved in the following transactions during the 2018 season:

Trades

Free agent signings

Signings

Cuts

Draft

Draft trades
The Steelers traded their fourth-round selection (128th overall) to San Francisco in exchange for San Francisco's fifth-round selection (148th overall) and tight end Vance McDonald.
The Steelers traded their sixth-round selection (202nd overall) to Cleveland in exchange for cornerback Justin Gilbert.  Cleveland then traded this selection back to Pittsburgh in exchange for a 2019 seventh round selection and WR Sammie Coates.  Pittsburgh then traded this selection to Tampa Bay in exchange for Tampa Bay's seventh-round selection in 2019 and free safety J. J. Wilcox.
The Steelers traded cornerback Ross Cockrell to the New York Giants in exchange for the Giants' seventh-round selection (220th overall)

The Steelers traded wide receiver Martavis Bryant to the Oakland Raiders in exchange for Oakland's third-round selection previously acquired from the Arizona Cardinals (79th overall). They later traded the 79th selection and their seventh-round selection (220th overall) to the Seattle Seahawks for Seattle's third-round pick (76th overall).

Undrafted free agents
All undrafted free agents were signed after the 2018 NFL draft concluded on April 28 unless otherwise noted.

Staff

Final roster

Preseason

Regular season

Schedule
The Steelers' regular season schedule was announced on April 19.

Note: Intra-division opponents are in bold text.

Game summaries

Week 1: at Cleveland Browns

The Steelers started their season on the road against the Browns. After a scoreless first quarter, the Steelers struck first in the second when second-year RB James Conner ran for a 4-yard touchdown to make it 7–0 at halftime. After the break, the Browns went to work as Tyrod Taylor ran for a 20-yard touchdown to tie the game up at 7–7. However, the Steelers retook the lead with 2 more touchdowns: Ben Roethlisberger found Antonio Brown on a 22-yard pass followed up by Conner's second touchdown of the day from 22 yards out to make it 14–7 and then 21–7. In the fourth quarter however, it was all Browns when Carlos Hyde ran for a 1-yard touchdown followed by Taylor connecting with Josh Gordon on a 17-yard touchdown to make it 21–14 and then 21–21. In overtime, both teams' defenses showed out. Neither team would score, leading to a tie.

With the tie, the Steelers started their season 0–0–1. It was the first time ever that they played the Browns to a tie game. This would snap their 6-game winning streak over the Browns. Also, the team's winning streak against division rivals was snapped. They also had their first tie game since 2002 against the Atlanta Falcons. Roethlisberger tied his career high of 5 turnovers in a game (3 interceptions, 2 lost fumbles) as the team turned the ball over 6 times including a Conner fumble late in the fourth quarter.

On a positive note, the team's defense was able to get a turnover of their own (1 interception) and sack Taylor 7 times.

Week 2: vs. Kansas City Chiefs

The Steelers had their home opener against the Chiefs. In the first quarter, it was all Chiefs when Patrick Mahomes threw 3 touchdowns: a 15-yard pass to Chris Conley, a 19-yard pass to Travis Kelce, and a 5-yard pass to Kareem Hunt to make the score 7–0, 14–0, and then 21–0. In the second quarter, the Steelers responded with 3 touchdowns of their own to tie the game up when Ben Roethlisberger connected with Jesse James on a 26-yard pass, followed up with him connecting with JuJu Smith-Schuster on a 2-yard pass (with a failed PAT), and then connecting with James Washington on a 14-yard pass (with a successful 2-point conversion pass to James Conner) to make it 21–7, 21–13, and then 21–21 at halftime. In the third quarter, the Chiefs moved back into the lead when Mahomes found Kelce again on a 25-yard pass to make it 28–21. The Steelers would tie it up when James Conner ran for a 1-yard touchdown to make it 28–28. The Chiefs would pull away again as Mahomes connected with Demarcus Robinson on a 3-yard pass to make it 35–28. In the fourth quarter, the Chiefs moved ahead by double digits as Mahomes found Tyreek Hill on a 29-yard pass to make it 42–28. The Steelers scored twice to come within 5: first when Hunt was tackled by Artie Burns and Morgan Burnett in the end zone for a safety followed by Roethlisberger's 3-yard run for a touchdown to make it 42–30 and then 42–37. With seconds left, the defense was able to get the stop and was about to get their offense back on the field for likely one final play. But a flag for roughing the kicker kept the Chiefs' offense on the field, which sealed the game.

With the loss, the Steelers dropped to 0–1–1. With the Browns' loss to the Saints, both teams remain tied for third place in the AFC North.

Roethlisberger's record against the Chiefs would drop to 6–2. He passed John Elway for seventh-most passing yards in NFL history.

During the game, WR Antonio Brown was caught on camera arguing with offensive coordinator Randy Fichtner for not getting enough playing time during the game. This was only the start of a turmoil-filled season for the Steelers.

Week 3: at Tampa Bay Buccaneers

After a tough loss at home, the Steelers traveled to Tampa Bay to take on the Buccaneers. The Bucs scored first when Cameron Brate caught a 4-yard pass from Ryan Fitzpatrick to make it 7–0. The Steelers would answer when Ben Roethlisberger found Vance McDonald on a 75-yard pass to make it 7–6. The Steelers continued to score heading into the second quarter: they took the lead with Chris Boswell's 38-yard field goal to make it 9–7. This would be followed up by Roethlisberger finding Antonio Brown on a 27-yard pass to make it 16–7, and then Bud Dupree intercepted Fitzpatrick to return it 10 yards for a touchdown to make it 23–7. The Bucs came closer when Chandler Catanzaro kicked a 21-yard field goal to make it 23–10. The Steelers wrapped up the first half scoring when Roethlisberger found Ryan Switzer on a 1-yard pass to make it 30–10. In the second half, it was all Bucs as they would outscore the Steelers 17–0 heading into the fourth quarter when Catanzaro kicked a 28-yard field goal to make it 30–13 in the third. In the fourth, the Bucs ended up coming within 3 when Fitzpatrick threw 4-yard and 24-yard passes to Chris Godwin and Mike Evans to make it 30–20 and then 30–27. The Steelers' defense held them off at the last moment to win the game, sealing the win.

With the win, the Steelers improved to 1–1–1.  This would be the team's first 1–1–1 start since 1974.

The defense which had earned 2 turnovers in their first 2 games earned 4 turnovers in this game alone (3 interceptions, 1 recovered fumble).

Week 4: vs. Baltimore Ravens

After winning in prime time on the road, the Steelers returned home for a prime time game against their arch-rival, the Ravens. In the first quarter, it was all Ravens when Joe Flacco threw 2 touchdowns: a 33-yard pass to John Brown followed up by a 3-yard pass to Alex Collins to make it 7–0 and then 14–0. In the second quarter, the Steelers responded as Chris Boswell nailed field goals from 34 and 39 yards out to make it 14–3 and then 14–6. This would be followed by Ben Roethlisberger finding Antonio Brown on a 26-yard pass (with a successful 2-point conversion) to tie the game up at 14–14 going into halftime. In the second half, Justin Tucker kicked a 47-yard field goal in the third quarter to make it 17–14 for the Ravens. He would kick 3 more in the fourth to seal the game from 49, 28, and 31 yards out to make it 20–14, 23–14, and the final score 26–14.

With the loss, the Steelers fell to 1–2–1. Also, their 3-game winning streak against the Ravens was snapped.

Week 5: vs. Atlanta Falcons

After a tough loss, the Steelers stayed at home for a duel against the Falcons. In the first quarter, it was all Steelers as James Conner ran for a 1-yard touchdown (with a failed PAT) to make it 6–0. Ben Roethlisberger then connected with JuJu Smith-Schuster on an 18-yard pass to make it 13–0. In the second quarter, the Falcons responded when Matt Ryan found Mohamed Sanu on a 43-yard pass to make it 13–7. This would be followed by Matt Bryant kicking a 47-yard field goal to make it 13–10 at halftime. In the third quarter, Roethlisberger found Antonio Brown on a 9-yard pass to make it 20–10. This would be followed up by Conner running for a 2-yard touchdown to make it 27–10. In the fourth quarter, the Falcons drew closer when Ito Smith ran for a 2-yard touchdown to make it 27–17. However, the Steelers sealed the game with 2 more touchdowns: Roethlisberger found Brown on a 47-yard pass to make it 34–17 followed by L. J. Fort recovering a fumble in the end zone to make the final score 41–17.

With the win, the Steelers improved to 2–2–1.

After being outscored 29–0 in the second half of their previous 2 games, the Steelers outscored the Falcons 28–7 in the second half.

With the win, the Steelers won their 100th regular season game at Heinz Field since its opening in 2001 with a record of 100-38-1 at that point.

Week 6: at Cincinnati Bengals

After a huge win at home, the Steelers traveled to Cincinnati for Game 1 against the Bengals. The Bengals scored first when Andy Dalton found Tyler Boyd on a 2-yard pass to make it 7–0 for the only points of the first quarter. In the second quarter, the Steelers took the lead when James Conner ran for 2 1-yard touchdowns to make it 7–7 and then 14–7. The Bengals managed to tie the game up at halftime when Dalton found Boyd on a 14-yard pass to make it 14–14. In the third quarter, the Steelers scored when Chris Boswell kicked a 21-yard field goal to make it 17–14. They would increase their lead in the fourth quarter when Boswell kicked another one from 24 yards out to make it 20–14. However, the Bengals would take the lead when Joe Mixon ran for a 4-yard touchdown to make it 21–20. The Steelers completed the comeback when Ben Roethlisberger found Antonio Brown on a 31-yard pass (with a successful 2-point conversion) to make the final score 28–21. With just :10 on the game clock, Dalton tried for the eventual home run ball. Though, the pass fell incomplete ending the game and giving the Steelers the win.

With the win and their 7th straight victory against the Bengals, the Steelers go into their bye week 3–2–1. The team was also able to snap being tied with the Browns as they would move into first place in the AFC North.

Week 8: vs. Cleveland Browns

After coming off the bye week, the Steelers returned home for their second game against the Browns. In the first quarter, the Browns would score 2 field goals as Greg Joseph kicked them from 34 and 45 yards out to make it 3–0 and then 6–0. In the second quarter, the Steelers took the lead when Ben Roethlisberger found Antonio Brown on 2 touchdown passes: from 43 and 1 yard to make it 7–6 and then 14–6 by halftime. In the third quarter, the Steelers increased their lead as a holding penalty in the end zone on Browns offensive tackle Desmond Harrison led to a safety, making the score 16–6. The Browns came within 4 when Baker Mayfield found Antonio Callaway on a 1-yard pass (with a failed PAT) to make it 16–12. The Steelers responded with James Conner's 12-yard touchdown run to make it 23–12. In the fourth, the Steelers increased their lead when Chris Boswell kicked a 42-yard field goal to make it 26–12. This would be followed by Conner's second touchdown run from 22 yards out to make the score 33–12. The Browns scored on their last offensive play of the game as Mayfield found Seth DeValve on a 24-yard pass (with a failed 2-point conversion) to make the final score 33–18.

With the win, the Steelers improved to 4–2–1 and maintained their lead in the AFC North. This also marked the Steelers' fifteenth consecutive win over the Browns in Pittsburgh. This was Hue Jackson's final game as the Browns head coach as he would be fired the next day.

A day prior to this game, eleven people were killed when a mass shooting occurred in the Squirrel Hill section of Pittsburgh. A moment of silence was observed for the victims prior to the game's kickoff. Two days later members of the Steelers attended the memorial services of Cecil and David Rosenthal sister of former community relations manager Michelle Rosenthal.

Week 9: at Baltimore Ravens

After winning over the Browns at home, the Steelers traveled to Baltimore for their second game against the Ravens. The Ravens scored first when Justin Tucker kicked a 23-yard field goal to make it 3–0. The Steelers however took the lead when Ben Roethlisberger found James Conner on a 7-yard pass to make it 7–3. In the second quarter, the Steelers went up by double digits as Ben Roethlisberger found Antonio Brown on a 6-yard pass to make it 14–3. The Ravens closed the scoring of the first half with Tucker's second field goal from 23 yards out to make it 14–6 at halftime. In the third quarter, the Steelers went back to work as Roethlisberger ran for a touchdown (with a failed PAT) from a yard out to make it 20–6. The Ravens scored one of their own when Alex Collins made it into the end zone with a 1-yard touchdown to make it 20–13. The Steelers pulled away in the fourth quarter as Chris Boswell kicked a 29-yard field goal to make it 23–13. Tucker then kicked a 37-yard field goal to get the Ravens closer and to make it 23–16. Both teams' defenses showed up late, and Roethlisberger was sacked at the Steelers' 41-yard line. However, trapped in their own territory, the Ravens failed to convert a 4th and long, sealing the win for the Steelers with the final score 23–16.

With the win, the Steelers improved to 5–2–1 and maintained their lead in the AFC North.

Week 10: vs. Carolina Panthers

After a tough road win, the Steelers went back home to take on the Panthers on Thursday Night Football. The Panthers scored first in the first quarter when Cam Newton found Christian McCaffrey on a 20-yard pass to make it 7–0. However, the Steelers responded with 3 touchdowns of their own to close out the quarter: Ben Roethlisberger found JuJu Smith-Schuster on a 75-yard pass on the team's first offensive play of the game, and on the next scrimmage play, Vince Williams intercepted Cam Newton and returned it 17 yards for a touchdown. James Conner closed out the scoring in the first quarter when he scored from 2 yards out to make it 21–7. The Steelers would score again in the second quarter when Chris Boswell kicked a 50-yard field goal to make it 24–7. The Panthers would draw closer when Newton and McCaffrey connected again on a 25-yard pass to make it 24–14. Roethlisberger then found Antonio Brown on a 53-yard pass to make the score 31–14 at halftime. In the third quarter, it was all Steelers when Roethlisberger threw 2 more touchdown passes: a 12-yarder to Vance McDonald and then an 8-yarder to Jesse James to increase their lead to 45–14. In the fourth quarter, Roethlisberger found Jaylen Samuels on a 6-yard pass to put the Steelers up 52–14. McCaffrey then put up a 1-yard touchdown in the closing minutes to make the final score 52–21.

With the win, the Steelers improved to 6–2–1. The team's 52 points was the most ever scored in a single game at Heinz Field, and the most by the franchise since 1984. Ben Roethlisberger became the second quarterback to record a perfect 158.3 passer rating in four games in his career, after Peyton Manning.

Week 11: at Jacksonville Jaguars

After a blowout victory against the Panthers, the Steelers traveled to Jacksonville to face the Jaguars. After a scoreless first quarter, the Jags put up 3 field goals in the second when Josh Lambo converted from 48, 38, and 43 yards out to make it 3–0, 6–0, and then 9–0 at halftime. In the third quarter, the Jaguars would make it 16–0 after Leonard Fournette ran for a 2-yard touchdown. From then on, it was all Steelers scoring when Ben Roethlisberger found Antonio Brown on a 78-yard pass to make it 16–6 heading into the fourth quarter. In the final quarter, Roethlisberger found Vance McDonald on an 11-yard touchdown pass to draw the Steelers within three points. On the Steelers' final offensive drive, Roethlisberger ran for a 1-yard touchdown to make it 20–16 with five seconds remaining in the game, completing the comeback victory.

With the win, the Steelers improved to 7–2–1. This would be the team's third straight season with a 6-game winning streak.

Week 12: at Denver Broncos

After a tough win over the Jags, the Steelers traveled out west to face the Broncos.  The Broncos scored first when Brandon McManus kicked a 41-yard field goal to make it 3–0 for the first quarter's only points.  The Steelers tied it up in the second quarter when Chris Boswell kicked a 41-yard field goal of his own to make it 3–3. The Broncos retook the lead when Case Keenum found Matt LaCosse on a 10-yard pass to make it 10–3. The Steelers tied it up when Boswell found Alejandro Villanueva on a 2-yard pass on a fake field goal to make it 10–10 at halftime. After the break, the Steelers went back to work as Ben Roethlisberger found JuJu-Smith Schuster on a 97-yard pass to take the lead 17–10. The Broncos then tied it up again when Keenum found Emmanuel Sanders on a 5-yard pass to make it 17–17 following a Chris Harris Jr. interception of Roethlisberger. In the fourth the Broncos retook the lead and went on to win the game when Philip Lindsay ran for a 2-yard touchdown to make the score 24–17. Roethlisberger tried to rally the Steelers into a potential overtime period, but his 3rd-and-goal pass intended for Antonio Brown would be intercepted by Shelby Harris with a minute left to play, sealing the win for the Broncos.

With their 6-game winning streak snapped, the Steelers fell to 7–3–1. This was the first road loss for the Steelers since Week 3 of the 2017 season.

Week 13: vs. Los Angeles Chargers

After a tough road loss, the Steelers returned home for a Sunday Night Football duel against the Chargers. The Steelers struck first in the first quarter when James Conner ran for two 1-yard touchdowns to make it 7–0 and then 13–0 (due to a failed PAT) but the Chargers would respond on a controversial touchdown, due to movement on the Chargers offensive line before the ball was snapped, when Philip Rivers found Travis Benjamin on a 46-yard pass to make it 13–7. In the second quarter, the Steelers pulled away as Chris Boswell kicked a 48-yard field goal to make it 16–7. This would be followed up with Ben Roethlisberger finding Antonio Brown on a 28-yard pass to make it 23–7 at halftime. In the third quarter, the Chargers drew closer when Rivers found Keenan Allen on a 10-yard pass (with a successful 2-point conversion) to make it 23–15. In the fourth quarter, they would tie the game up as Desmond King returned a punt 73 yards for a touchdown. Rivers then connected with Allen for another 2-point conversion to make it 23–23. The Chargers would then take the lead when Justin Jackson ran for an 18-yard touchdown to make it 30–23. The Steelers tied it up later on however when Roethlisberger found Jaylen Samuels on a 10-yard pass, making it 30–30. The Chargers would seal the game when Mike Badgley kicked a 29-yard field goal to make the final score 33–30.

With the loss, the Steelers fell to 7–4–1.

Week 14: at Oakland Raiders

After a tough loss at home, the Steelers traveled out west to face the Raiders. The Raiders scored first in the first quarter when Doug Martin ran for a 1-yard touchdown to make it 7–0 for that period's only score. The Steelers managed to tie it up in the second quarter when Stevan Ridley ran for a 2-yard touchdown to make it 7–7. The Raiders would retake the lead when Daniel Carson kicked a 44-yard field goal to make it 10–7. The Steelers moved back into the lead when Ben Roethlisberger found JuJu-Smith Schuster on a 1-yard pass to make it 14–10 at halftime. After a scoreless third quarter, the Raiders would retake the lead in the fourth when Derek Carr found Lee Smith on a 3-yard pass to make it 17–14. The Steelers then retook the lead when Roethlisberger found Smith-Schuster on another 1-yard pass to make it 21–17. The Raiders quickly answered when Carr found Derek Carrier on a 6-yard pass to retake the lead 24–21. Pittsburgh got the ball one final time, advancing deep into Raiders territory with a hook and lateral play from James Washington to Smith-Schuster, but kicker Chris Boswell slipped and missed the potential game-tying field goal.

With their third straight loss, the Steelers fell to 7–5–1 and finished 0–4 against the AFC West. Roethlisberger's record against the Raiders in Oakland also dropped to 0–4.

Week 15: vs. New England Patriots

After a tough road loss, the Steelers returned home for a game against the Patriots. In the first quarter, the Steelers scored first when Ben Roethlisberger found Vance McDonald on a 5-yard pass to make it 7–0. The Patriots tied the game up when Tom Brady found Chris Hogan on a 63-yard pass to make it 7–7. In the second quarter, the Steelers moved back into the lead when Roethlisberger found Antonio Brown on a 17-yard pass to make it 14–7 at halftime. In the third quarter, the Pats managed to score and come within 4 when Stephen Gostkowski kicked a 33-yard field goal to make it 14–10 for the quarter's only score. However, the Steelers moved up ahead by 7 in the fourth quarter when Chris Boswell kicked a 48-yard field goal to make it 17–10. The Pats were able to drive down the field with under 2 minutes left, but after a penalty which would back them further away from the first down marker, Brady would throw 4 straight incompletions to end the game with that final score.

With the win and 3-game losing streak snapped, the Steelers improved to 8–5–1. Roethlisberger's career record against the Patriots improved to 4–8. The team was also able to snap their 5-game losing streak to the Pats, beating them for the first time since 2011.

Week 16: at New Orleans Saints

After a tough win over the Patriots, the Steelers traveled south to take on the Saints. In the first quarter, the Steelers scored first when Chris Boswell kicked a 49-yard field goal to make it 3–0. In the first quarter, on 4th and 1 from the Pittsburgh 35, the Saints tried a long pass into the endzone, on which a defensive pass interference was called, giving the Saints 1st and goal at the 1, on which they would take the lead when Mark Ingram II ran for a 1-yard touchdown to make it 7–3. In the second quarter, the Steelers came within a point as Boswell kicked another field goal from 30 yards out to make it 7–6. The Saints pulled away when Alvin Kamara ran for an 8-yard touchdown to make it 14–6. The Steelers would tie it up when Ben Roethlisberger found Jaylen Samuels on a 3-yard pass (with a successful 2-point conversion) to make it 14–14. The Saints moved up 17–14 at halftime when Wil Lutz kicked a 43-yard field goal. In the third quarter, the Saints increased their lead when Kamara ran for a 1-yard touchdown to make it 24–14. The Steelers would take the lead when Roethlisberger found Antonio Brown on touchdown passes from 3 and 20 yards out to narrow the Saints' lead to 24–21 and then take the lead 28–24. In the fourth quarter, the Saints were able to complete the comeback when Drew Brees found Michael Thomas on a 2-yard pass to make the final score 31–28. Roethlisberger's best effort at a late rally would come up short when star wide receiver JuJu Smith-Schuster fumbled in Saints territory with less than a minute remaining, effectively sealing the win for the Saints.

With the loss, the Steelers fell to 8–6–1 and second place in the AFC North.

The game, ironically, was also Brown's last in a Steelers uniform. He would then tie with Brandon Marshall for most seasons with 1,000 yards and 100 receptions in NFL history with 6. He was subsequently benched for week 17 after his heated confrontation with Roethlisberger at practice. The Steelers would eventually trade Brown to the Oakland Raiders on March 10, 2019 for a third-round and a fifth-round pick in the 2019 NFL Draft.

Week 17: vs. Cincinnati Bengals

After a tough loss and their playoff chances on the line, the Steelers went home for the season finale at home for Round 2 against the Bengals.  After a scoreless first quarter, the Bengals would score in the second quarter when Shawn Williams returned an interception 58 yards for a touchdown to make it 7–0.  They made it 10–0 after Randy Bullock kicked a 49-yard field goal.  The Steelers managed to get on the board before halftime when Matt McCrane kicked a 39-yard field goal to make it 10–3 at halftime.  The Steelers managed to tie it up when Ben Roethlisberger found JuJu Smith-Schuster on an 11-yard pass to make it 10–10.  They would then make it 13–10 when McCrane kicked a 47-yard field goal.  The Bengals tied it up when Bullock kicked a 32-yard field goal.  However, the Steelers would retake the lead when McCrane kicked a 35-yard field goal to make it 16–13 for the final score of the game.

With the 8th straight win over the Bengals, the Steelers finished their season 9–6–1.  At the conclusion of the game, the Jumbotron showed the conclusion of the Browns-Ravens game, with most of the fans sticking around and most of players waiting on the field.  However, the Ravens would win that game sending the Steelers to second place in the division, officially missing the playoffs for the first time in 5 years, thus capping off a disappointing and bitter end to one of the most turbulent seasons in franchise history.

Standings

Division

Conference

Awards

Other

See also
List of NFL teams affected by internal conflict

References

External links 
 2018 Pittsburgh Steelers season statistics at Pro Football Reference 
 2018 Pittsburgh Steelers season statistics at jt-sw.com 
 
Days Of Our Steelers - The Complete 2018 Season on YouTube

Pittsburgh
Pittsburgh Steelers seasons
Pittsburgh Steelers
2010s in Pittsburgh